Margarita Gasparyan was the defending champion. but lost in the second round to Danka Kovinić.

Alison Van Uytvanck won the title, defeating 2008 champion Sorana Cîrstea in the final 6–2, 4–6, 6–4.

Seeds

Draw

Finals

Top half

Bottom half

Qualifying

Seeds

Qualifiers

Qualifying draw

First qualifier

Second qualifier

Third qualifier

Fourth qualifier

References

External links
Main Draw
Qualifying Draw

2019 WTA Tour
Singles